Michael Meggison (born 31 October 1949) is a British sports shooter. He competed in the men's 50 metre running target event at the 1984 Summer Olympics.

References

External links
 

1949 births
Living people
British male sport shooters
Olympic shooters of Great Britain
Shooters at the 1984 Summer Olympics
Sportspeople from Harrogate